Sir George Dallas, 1st Baronet (6 April 1758 – 14 January 1833), was a British barrister and poet. Although he lived in England, he came from a Scottish family. He was created a baronet, of Upper Harley Street in the County of Middlesex, on 31 July 1798. He briefly succeeded William Hamilton Nisbet as one of the Members of Parliament for Newport, Isle of Wight, in 1800, holding the seat only until the next election in 1802.

Dallas and his brother Robert were educated first at James Elphinston's school in Kensington and then in Geneva by the pastor Chauvet. After entering the legal profession, Dallas became a judge.

On 11 June 1788, Dallas married Margaret Catherine Blackwood, the daughter of Sir John Blackwood, 2nd Baronet, and Dorcas, Lady Dufferin and Claneboye. Their son was Sir Robert Dallas, 2nd Baronet (23 December 1804 – 2 August 1874). Their daughter, Marianne Dallas, married Sir Peter Parker, 2nd Baronet. Another daughter, Catherine, married the Hon. George Poulett RN, and thanks to a series of deaths, her son William Henry Poulett (1827–1899) unexpectedly became the 6th Earl Poulett.

References
 John Debrett, The baronetage of England. revised, corrected and continued by G.W. Collen, S.151 Dallas

1758 births
1833 deaths
Baronets in the Baronetage of Great Britain
Tory MPs (pre-1834)
Members of the Parliament of Great Britain for English constituencies
Members of the Parliament of the United Kingdom for English constituencies
UK MPs 1801–1802